Milan is a city in Sumner County, Kansas, United States.  As of the 2020 census, the population of the city was 56.

History
Milan was founded in 1880. It was named after Milan, in Italy.

Geography
Milan is located at  (37.257057, -97.674712).

Demographics

2010 census
As of the census of 2010, there were 82 people, 36 households, and 26 families residing in the city. The racial makeup of the city was 93.9% White, 4.9% from other races, and 1.2% from two or more races. Hispanic or Latino of any race were 1.2% of the population.

There were 36 households, of which 27.8% had children under the age of 18 living with them, 61.1% were married couples living together, 11.1% had a female householder with no husband present, and 27.8% were non-families. 22.2% of all households were made up of individuals, and 11.1% had someone living alone who was 65 years of age or older. The average household size was 2.28 and the average family size was 2.65.

The median age in the city was 41 years. 22% of residents were under the age of 18; 8.5% were between the ages of 18 and 24; 20.8% were from 25 to 44; 25.6% were from 45 to 64; and 23.2% were 65 years of age or older. The gender makeup of the city was 50.0% male and 50.0% female.

2000 census
As of the census of 2000, there were 137 people, 51 households, and 36 families residing in the city. The racial makeup of the city was 96.35% White, 1.46% Native American, 2.19% from other races. Hispanic or Latino of any race were 2.19% of the population.

There were 51 households, out of which 29.4% had children under the age of 18 living with them, 58.8% were married couples living together, 13.7% had a female householder with no husband present, and 27.5% were non-families. 21.6% of all households were made up of individuals, and 11.8% had someone living alone who was 65 years of age or older. The average household size was 2.69 and the average family size was 3.24.

In the city, the population was spread out, with 30.7% under the age of 18, 8.0% from 18 to 24, 23.4% from 25 to 44, 27.0% from 45 to 64, and 10.9% who were 65 years of age or older. The median age was 36 years. For every 100 females, there were 114.1 males. For every 100 females age 18 and over, there were 97.9 males.

The median income for a household in the city was $33,750, and the median income for a family was $39,583. Males had a median income of $35,833 versus $16,964 for females. The per capita income for the city was $13,236. There were 11.4% of families and 6.2% of the population living below the poverty line, including no under eighteens and 14.3% of those over 64.

Economy
As of December 2011, there are currently no businesses in Milan. Operations were suspended indefinitely at the United States Post Office on November 29, 2011. Previous businesses in Milan included a grocery store and a restaurant. Milan Grocery was open sporadically during the 1970s and 1980s. Opal's Cafe was open for business during much of the 1980s.

Education
The community is served by Argonia USD 359 public school district.

Milan High School was closed through school unification. The Milan High School mascot was Dragons.

References

Further reading

External links
 Milan - Directory of Public Officials
 Milan city map, KDOT

Cities in Kansas
Cities in Sumner County, Kansas
Wichita, KS Metropolitan Statistical Area